Ted Harris may refer to:
Ted Harris (company director) (born 1927), Australian company director
Ted Harris (ice hockey) (born 1936), professional ice hockey player in the National Hockey League
Ted Harris (songwriter), songwriter in the Nashville Songwriters Hall of Fame
Ted Harris (mathematician) (1919–2005), American mathematician
Ted Harris (pastor) (born 1952), Swedish-Barbadian pastor, writer and theologian
Ted Harris (politician) (1920–1993), member of the Queensland Legislative Assembly

See also
Edward Harris (disambiguation)